The Association for Computer-Aided Architectural Design Research in Asia (CAADRIA) (founded in 1996) provides a platform for CAAD-related academics and professionals to share experiences, best practices, and results in education and research in Asia and beyond.

Objectives 

The association has been created with several objectives. It aims to facilitate dissemination of information about CAAD amongst Asian Schools of Architecture, Planning, Engineering, & Building Sciences in Asia, and encourage the exchange of software, courseware, experiences and staff/students amongst schools. It conducts several activities to identify research and development needs specific to CAAD education and initiate collaboration to satisfy them, and promote research and teaching in CAAD which enhances creativity rather than simply production technologies.

Organisation

Membership 

Membership to the association is open to individuals (teachers, researchers, students, and architects) and institutions (universities, libraries), either as active member (someone who attends the conference) or as sponsor member. Typically, one becomes an individual member through attending and registering at a CAADRIA conference, or by applying for membership to the secretariat. Institutions in Asia, Australia and New Zealand can apply for institutional membership and gain access to CumInCAD database.

Membership lasts for one year, and gives access to digital proceedings of CAADRIA, email announcements of forthcoming events of interest and one vote at the Annual General Meeting of CAADRIA.

Executive committee 

CAADRIA is governed by an administrative council elected by the membership. Responsibility for organisation, administration and guidance of the association is delegated to the executive committee by virtue of the election of the officers. Membership of the council is restricted to members working in countries within the Asia Pacific region; term of office is two years. There is an annual general meeting (normally convened during the annual conference) at which the business of the association is agreed by the membership. This forum is considered the highest level of authority and shall be the only one with the power to amend the charter of CAADRIA.

Secretariat 

The Secretariat is composed of volunteer staff, with a limited budget being made available through membership dues and supervised by the executive committee.

List of presidents

Activities

List of conferences 

The annual conference is the main event organised under the auspices of the association. It is organised by a member in good standing, who volunteers for the organisation. The organiser is supported by members of the administrative council, in particular the conference liaison. Over the years, the association has developed the policy to circulate the conference location in such a way that southern, eastern, western, and northern parts of Europe are reached regularly – although this principle can only be maintained on the basis of available organisers. In the past years, the following CAADRIA conferences have been organised:

Publications

Proceedings  
Each year the conference papers are gathered into a proceedings publication which is distributed to members, and available to the public via the organization's web site.

CumInCAD 

CumInCAD is a cumulative index of publications about computer-aided architectural design. Full texts, in PDF, of CAADRIA proceedings are available through this archive. Public CumInCAD records are available via an Open Archives Initiative Protocol for Metadata Harvesting (OAI-PMH) feed and records are available via multiple  bibliographic archives and citation indexes online.

International Journal of Architectural Computing 
The International Journal of Architectural Computing (IJAC) is an international, peer-reviewed academic journal in the area of CAAD. This journal was established as an international collaboration between the sister organisations and continues to be supported by those sister organisations, representatives of which are members of the editorial board. It is produced quarterly, both in print and online, and a special rate of subscription is available to all members of CAADRIA.

Awards and fellowships

CAADRIA fellows 
 Tomohiro Fukuda, Osaka University
 John Gero, University of Sydney
 Thomas Kvan, The University of Melbourne
 Marc Aurel Schnabel, Victoria University of Wellington

Tee Sasada Award 

The Sasada Award is instituted in the memory of Professor Tsuyoshi Sasada (1941-2005), Emeritus Professor at Osaka University, as well as co-founder and Fellow of CAADRIA. This award is given to an individual whose sustained record of contributions demonstrates or promises significant impact on the field of computer-aided design. In keeping with Tee’s spirit, the award recipient should have contributed to the next generation of researchers and academics, to the wider profession and practice in computer-aided design and research, and earned recognition in the peer community. The Sasada Award is announced and presented at the annual CAADRIA conference. The Award supports the winner to undertake an academic visit at the Osaka Lab and covers return airfare, accommodation and meals for one week. The Award recipient is expected to contribute to the academic and research activities at the Osaka Lab in the form of seminars and interaction with research students and staff.

Best Paper Award 

The Best Paper Award Committee is organized at the conference site by the Exco member in charge of awards. The Site Coordinator identifies two local members who are appropriately qualified to join this committee. All papers printed in proceedings and presented at the conference are eligible for this award. The paper is awarded on the basis of the clarity of writing, good structure and argument, contribution to the field, a good conclusion, contribution and relevance to CAADRIA, use of appropriate illustrations and tables, and appropriate references.

Best Presentation Award 

The Best Presentation Award Committee is organized at the conference site by the Exco member in charge of awards. The Site Coordinator identifies two local members who are appropriately qualified to join this committee. Only presentations made by one of the authors are eligible for this award. The presentations are awarded on the basis of: good use of time, how well-paced they are, good use of appropriate media, delivery, contribution and relevance to CAADRIA, and how well questions have been handled.

Young CAADRIA Award 

Young CAADRIA Award is funded by CAADRIA and consists of a waiver of the conference delegation fees if the abstract is selected for a paper presentation. It is awarded on the basis of the CV provided.

Related organisations

Sister organisations 
CAADRIA is one of five sister organisations in CAAD worldwide that
share the same mission: ACADIA (North America, founded 1981), SIGraDi (Ibero-America, founded 1997), eCAADe (Europe, founded 1983), and ASCAAD (Arabic countries of west Asia, and North Africa, founded 2001).

Other organisations and resources 

A strongly related organisation in the area of CAAD is the CAAD Futures Foundation (global scope, founded 1985).

See also 
 Comparison of CAD software
 CAADRIA 2015

External links

Architectural design
Non-profit organisations based in Hong Kong
Architecture-related professional associations
Computer-aided design software
Information technology organizations based in Asia
Osaka University research